Krayni Dol is a village in Dupnitsa Municipality, located in the Kyustendil Province of southwestern Bulgaria.

References

Villages in Kyustendil Province